Air Niugini serves the following destinations as of January 2019:

List

References

Lists of airline destinations